The Gymnastics competition in the 2009 Summer Universiade were held in Belgrade, Serbia.

Medal overview

Artistic gymnastics

Men's events

Women's events

Rhythmic gymnastics

Medal table

References
 Universiade gymnastics medalists on HickokSports
 Universiade rhythmic gymnastics medalists on HickokSports

2009 in gymnastics
2009 Summer Universiade
Gymnastics at the Summer Universiade